In military terms, 91st Division or 91st Infantry Division may refer to:

Infantry divisions:
 91st Infantry Division (German Empire)
 91st Infantry Division (Wehrmacht) 
 91st Division (Israel)
 91st Division (Imperial Japanese Army)
 91st Division (Philippines)

 91st Division (United States)
 91st Rifle Division, Soviet Union
 91st Motor Rifle Division, Soviet Union

Aviation divisions:
91st Air Division, United States

See also
 91st Regiment (disambiguation)